The ringing of a school bell  announces important times to a school's students and staff, such as marking the beginnings and ends of the school day, class period, and breaks.

In some schools it may take the form of a physical bell, usually electrically operated. In other schools it may be a tone, siren, electronic bell sound, a series of chimes, or music played over a PA system. In East Asian nations such as China, North Korea  and South Korea, the Westminster Chimes pattern is commonly played as the bell.

Schools for the hearing impaired use alternative signaling methods, for example sign language from the teacher and lights that illuminate when the public address/bell is sounding.

Criticism

In October 2010, Mackie Academy in Stonehaven, Kincardineshire, Scotland, took the move to turn off their school bell system, following criticism that the school bells agitated pupils. According to the headteacher, the corridors became much quieter after the system was introduced. It was hoped that pupils would take more responsibility for ensuring they arrived on time to lessons. A number of other schools in the United Kingdom have made similar decisions and either partially or completely banning the school bell system.

Banning of school bells in Somalia
In April 2010, Al-Shabab–an Islamic militant group that controls large parts of Somalia–ordered school bells banned as they sounded too similar to church bells. Hand claps were then used as an alternative way of signaling that a class was beginning or ending.

See also
PA System
Last bell

References

External links

Bells (percussion)
Schools